Chottogram Division cricket team represents the Chittagong Division, one of the seven administrative regions in Bangladesh. The team was founded in 1999 to compete in the National Cricket League (NCL) and plays first-class cricket. For the short-lived National Cricket League Twenty20 in 2010, the team adopted the name Cyclones of Chittagong (often abbreviated as CC). The equivalent team in the Bangladesh Premier League is the Chittagong Vikings (qv), replacing the Chittagong Kings.

Chittagong Division play most of their home games at the Zohur Ahmed Chowdhury Stadium (ZAC) in the port city of Chittagong. The ZAC has superseded the older M. A. Aziz Stadium (MAA) as Chittagong's main cricket venue. The MAA is now used primarily for football.

Honours
 National Cricket League (1) – 1999–2000
 One-Day Cricket League (1) – 2003–04

History
Before Bangladesh became independent, Chittagong was part of East Pakistan and it had a cricket team which was scheduled to take part in the Quaid-i-Azam Trophy in both 1959–60 and 1964–65, and in the Ayub Trophy in 1962–63. None of the scheduled matches took place as all were abandoned without any start of play. East Pakistan cricket had a chequered history and it was only after independence that cricket in Bangladesh gained any real significance.

The earliest known match involving a Chittagong Division team was in March 1980 when they played Rajshahi Division in an Inter-Divisional Championship competition. In March 1986, they took part in a National Cricket Championship and reached the quarter-final stage. These were not first-class competitions and it was not until the late 1990s, after Bangladesh had made progress in international cricket, that there was any possibility of first-class cricket at the domestic level.

Bangladesh won the 1997 ICC Trophy and so qualified for the 1999 Cricket World Cup. There was then the very real prospect (realised in 2000) of the country being admitted to full membership of the International Cricket Council (the ICC) and so steps were taken to create an organised national championship. The result was the NCL which began in the 1999–2000 season, though it did not have first-class status until the 2000–01 season. It was decided that the NCL teams should represent each of the country's six (at that time) administrative divisions and so a Chittagong Division team was formed, playing its matches at the M. A. Aziz Stadium in Chittagong, the Comilla Stadium in Comilla and the Niaz Mohammad Stadium in Brahmanbaria. Chittagong Division won the 1999–2000 championship.

In 2000–01, Chittagong Division became a first-class team and has continued to compete in the NCL but with no further titles to 2016. The List A One-Day Cricket League began in 2000–01 and ran until 2010–11 when it was terminated. Chittagong Division won the competition once, in 2003–04.

Chittagong played in the Bangladesh NCL (National Cricket League) Twenty20 tournament which was staged for one season only, 2009–10, and used the name Cyclones of Chittagong (CC). The team's official colours were blue and white. Though captained by Nafees Iqbal and featuring Tamim Iqbal, the Cyclones were unsuccessful. They lost four of their five games and finished fifth in the six-team league.

Results in National Cricket League
 1999–2000: seven wins in 10 matches, champions 
 2000–01: five wins in 10 matches, finished second
 2001–02: two wins in 10 matches, finished third
 2002–03: three wins in six matches, finished third
 2003–04: one win in 10 matches, finished fifth
 2004–05: two wins in 10 matches, finished fourth
 2005–06: four wins in 10 matches, finished second
 2006–07: one win in 10 matches, finished third
 2007–08: four wins in 10 matches, finished fourth 
 2008–09: one win in 10 matches, finished fifth 
 2009–10: five wins in nine matches, finished second
 2010–11: no wins in five matches, finished sixth (last)
 2011–12: three wins in seven matches, finished fifth
 2012–13: two wins in seven matches, finished sixth
 2013–14: one win in seven matches, finished sixth
 2014–15: no wins in seven matches, finished eighth (last)
 2015–16: no wins in six matches, finished third in Tier 2
 2016–17: no wins in six matches, finished fourth (last) in Tier 2
 2017–18: no wins in six matches, finished equal fourth in Tier 2
 2018–19: one win in six matches, finished third in Tier 2
 2019-20: one win in six matches, finished fourth in Tier 2

Current squad
, The current squad for 2019–20 season

See also
 List of Chittagong Division cricketers

References

External links
 CricInfo re Chittagong squad 2015

.01
Bangladeshi first-class cricket teams
Bangladesh National Cricket League
Cricket clubs established in 1999
1999 establishments in Bangladesh